Nicola Vizzoni (born 4 November 1973 in Pietrasanta, Province of Lucca) is a male hammer thrower from Italy. He won the silver medal at the 2000 Summer Olympics and ten years later at the 2010 European Athletics Championships. His personal best throw is 80.50 metres, achieved in July 2001 in Formia.

He has won 19 medals (8 gold, 8 silver, 3 bronze) at the International athletics competitions.

Biography
He made his first appearance at the World Championships in Athletics in 1997 but he did not make the final. In 1999 he finished seventh in the hammer throw final and the next year he took the silver medal at the 2000 Sydney Olympics. He just missed out on the podium at the 2001 World Championships in Athletics, finishing fourth, but he gained regional honours with a gold at the 2001 Mediterranean Games and also won gold at the Summer Universiade.

He competed at the following two Olympic Games in 2004 and 2008, but was some distance off winning another medal. He became the Mediterranean champion for a second time with a win at the 2009 Mediterranean Games. Vizzoni made a strong start to the 2010 season, throwing 78.22 m early on and winning the gold at the 2010 European Cup Winter Throwing event.

He is engaged to former Italian athlete Claudia Coslovich, national record holder of the javelin throw.

Progression
He finished the season 8 times in world top 25.

Achievements

Palmarès
Nicola Vizzoni has been a finalist 10 times in his 17 appearances in the three major International athletics competitions.

National titles
Nicola Vizzoni has won the individual national championship 28 times.
14 wins in the hammer throw (1998, 2000, 2001, 2002, 2003, 2004, 2005, 2006, 2007, 2009, 2010, 2011, 2013, 2014)
14 wins in the hammer throw at the Italian Winter Throwing Championships (1994, 1998, 1999, 2000, 2001, 2002, 2003, 2008, 2009, 2010, 2011, 2013, 2014)

Honours
 Officer: Ufficiale Ordine al Merito della Repubblica Italiana: 27 September 2004

See also
 Athletes with most appearances at the World Championships
 Italian Athletics Championships – Multi winners
 Italy national athletics team – More caps
 Italian all-time top lists – Hammer throw

References

External links
 
  

1973 births
Living people
People from Pietrasanta
Italian male hammer throwers
Athletes (track and field) at the 2000 Summer Olympics
Athletes (track and field) at the 2004 Summer Olympics
Athletes (track and field) at the 2008 Summer Olympics
Athletes (track and field) at the 2012 Summer Olympics
Olympic athletes of Italy
Olympic silver medalists for Italy
World Athletics Championships athletes for Italy
Athletics competitors of Fiamme Gialle
European Athletics Championships medalists
Medalists at the 2000 Summer Olympics
Olympic silver medalists in athletics (track and field)
Mediterranean Games gold medalists for Italy
Mediterranean Games bronze medalists for Italy
Athletes (track and field) at the 2001 Mediterranean Games
Athletes (track and field) at the 2009 Mediterranean Games
Athletes (track and field) at the 2013 Mediterranean Games
Universiade medalists in athletics (track and field)
Mediterranean Games medalists in athletics
Universiade gold medalists for Italy
Medalists at the 2001 Summer Universiade
Italian Athletics Championships winners
Sportspeople from the Province of Lucca